Garcinia murtonii is a species of flowering plant in the family Clusiaceae. It is endemic to Peninsular Malaysia.

References

murtonii
Endemic flora of Peninsular Malaysia
Least concern plants
Taxonomy articles created by Polbot